Homilite is a borosilicate mineral belonging to the gadolinite group of minerals with formula .

It occurs as brown monoclinic crystals (space group P21/a) within feldspar masses in pegmatite and was discovered in 1876 in Stoko island, Langesundfiord, Norway. The name is from the Greek for to occur together, in allusion to its association with meliphanite and
allanite.

References

Calcium minerals
Iron(II) minerals
Magnesium minerals
Borate minerals
Nesosilicates
Monoclinic minerals
Minerals in space group 14
Borosilicates